Izabelin B is a village in the administrative district of Gmina Izabelin, within Warsaw West County, Masovian Voivodeship, in east-central Poland.

References

Izabelin B